Rhodes is an unincorporated community and census-designated place (CDP) in Flathead County, Montana, United States. It is in the western part of the county, in the valley of Big Lost Creek where it emerges from Rhodes Draw.

Rhodes was first listed as a CDP prior to the 2020 census.

Demographics

References 

Census-designated places in Flathead County, Montana
Census-designated places in Montana